Maria Lydia de Vega-Mercado (December 26, 1964 – August 10, 2022) was a Filipina athlete who was considered Asia's fastest woman in the 1980s.

Personal life
De Vega's father was Francisco "Tatang" De Vega, Sr. (August 13, 1928 – December 26, 2010), who was also her coach. De Vega had Singaporean athlete Jacter Singh as her long-time partner. They first met at the 1979 Asean Schools Track and Field Championships in Singapore and were together for six years prior to both of them entering separate marriages.

De Vega would marry another man named Paul Mercado in 1990, a former engineer at Meralco and an entrepreneur engaged in the fish pond business, with whom she had three children, including Stephanie (Paneng), who is a former collegiate volleyball player of the DLSU Lady Spikers. On February 13, 2001, her four-year-old son John Michael (JM) (October 31, 1996 – February 13, 2001) died in a car accident.

De Vega ended her marriage with Mercado. Singh divorced his wife on the same year. De Vega and Singh would restart their relationship.

Athletic career
De Vega was discovered in the Palarong Pambansa in the 1970s, and was recruited to be a part of Far Eastern University Tamaraws varsity track team. She then became a member of the Gintong Alay track and field program. She was coached by her father Francisco "Tatang" de Vega who was assisted by Claro Pellosis. Santos Magno and Anthony Benson later joined her training staff.

De Vega first made an impact at the 1981 Southeast Asian Games (SEA Games) held in Manila with gold medal performances in the 200 and 400 meter events exceeding records set at the Asian Games. As Asia's sprint queen, she ran away with the gold medal in the 100-meter dash in the 1982 Asian Games in  New Delhi and duplicated the feat in the same event at the 1986 edition in Seoul where she clocked 11.53 seconds. She developed a rivalry with Indian athlete P. T. Usha.

De Vega won the gold in the 100 meters at the SEA Games (1987, 1991 and 1993).  She also topped the 200 meter event in 1981, 1983, 1987 and 1993. She has twice won both the 100 and 200 meter golds in the Asian Athletics Championships – 1983 and 1987. As a 16-year old in the 1981 edition, she placed second in the 400 meter run and also bagged the bronze medal in the 200 meters.

De Vega was a two-time Olympian, represented the Philippines at the 1984 and 1988 Summer Olympics.

She also brought home a silver medal in the 200-meter race from the 1986 Seoul Asiad, and has once represented a friend for  the Long Jumps and broke her record.

In 1989 until 1991, De Vega took a break from athletics. During this period she got an academic degree and got married. She entered the 1991 Asian Athletics Championships and made a decent finish of seventh place.

De Vega retired after competing at the track and field event of the 1994 Manila-Fujian Games held in October. She won the 100m event. She announced that she would not be competing at the upcoming edition of the Philippine National Games at that time. She retired from her athletic career in 1994.

Later life and death
De Vega was elected as councilor of her native Meycauayan town in Bulacan province in 2001. In early 2005, she was appointed a liaison officer of the Alliance of Coaches and Athletes of the Philippines with the Philippine Sports Commission.

In December 2005, De Vega went to Singapore after receiving three job offers from Singaporean private schools to handle athletics. She coached young athletes in Singapore.  

In 2018, De Vega was diagnosed with stage 4 breast cancer. Over the next four years she underwent several procedures including a brain surgery.

She was one of the flag bearers of the official SEA Games flag at the opening ceremony of the 2019 Southeast Asian Games in the Philippines.

In July 2022, De Vega was reportedly "in critical condition". She died on August 10, 2022, after battling cancer while hospitalized at the Makati Medical Center.

Honors and awards
The Far Eastern University has inducted De Vega, one of their alumna, to their Sports Hall of Fame in 2008. In 2018, De Vega was inducted to the Philippine Sports Hall of Fame.

References

External links
 

1964 births
2022 deaths
Asian Games gold medalists for the Philippines
Asian Games medalists in athletics (track and field)
Asian Games silver medalists for the Philippines
Athletes (track and field) at the 1982 Asian Games
Athletes (track and field) at the 1984 Summer Olympics
Athletes (track and field) at the 1986 Asian Games
Athletes (track and field) at the 1988 Summer Olympics
Athletes (track and field) at the 1994 Asian Games
Competitors at the 1981 Southeast Asian Games
Competitors at the 1983 Southeast Asian Games
Competitors at the 1987 Southeast Asian Games
Competitors at the 1991 Southeast Asian Games
Competitors at the 1993 Southeast Asian Games
Deaths from breast cancer
Deaths from cancer in the Philippines
Filipino city and municipal councilors
Filipino expatriate sportspeople in Singapore
Filipino female sprinters
Filipino sportsperson-politicians
Filipino track and field coaches
Medalists at the 1982 Asian Games
Medalists at the 1986 Asian Games
Olympic female sprinters
Olympic track and field athletes of the Philippines
People from Meycauayan
Philippine Sports Hall of Fame inductees
Politicians from Bulacan
Southeast Asian Games medalists in athletics
Southeast Asian Games gold medalists for the Philippines
Sportspeople from Bulacan